Ronald Vink (born April 21, 1976) is a professional wheelchair tennis player from the Netherlands. He specializes in doubles but also plays singles.

Grand Slam performances
Vink has reached grand slam wheelchair doubles finals, capturing his first title at the 2007 Wimbledon Championships with compatriot Robin Ammerlaan. In 2008, he successfully defended his Wimbledon Wheelchair title by defeating the French duo of Stéphane Houdet and Nicoles Peifer. In 2011 he won for the third time the final with his partner Maikel Scheffers.

In singles, he has had less successes. Vink has never captured a singles title nor has he reached a final. His best effort came at the 2008 French Open, when he reached the semifinals.

Grand Slam Doubles Wheelchair finals

Wins (5)

Runners-up (5)

Paralympic performances
He represented the Netherlands at the Paralympics in Beijing 2008 and London 2012.

Beijing 2008
He competed in singles and doubles. In both events he made it to the semifinals but lost there and lost again in the bronze medal match.

London 2012
He competed in the singles and doubles events. In the semifinals of the singles event he lost from Shingo Kunieda but won the bronze medal match from Maikel Scheffers. In the bronze medal match of the doubles event he lost with his partner Robin Ammerlaan from the French Stéphane Houdet and Michaël Jeremiasz.

Performance timelines

Wheelchair singles

Wheelchair doubles

References

External links

1976 births
Living people
Dutch male tennis players
Wheelchair tennis players
Paralympic wheelchair tennis players of the Netherlands
People from Graft-De Rijp
Sportspeople from Alkmaar
Wheelchair tennis players at the 2008 Summer Paralympics
Wheelchair tennis players at the 2012 Summer Paralympics
Paralympic bronze medalists for the Netherlands
Medalists at the 2012 Summer Paralympics
Paralympic medalists in wheelchair tennis